Julián Ayala (born 6 March 1992) is a Mexican fencer. He competed in the men's sabre event at the 2016 Summer Olympics.

References

External links
 

1992 births
Living people
Mexican male sabre fencers
Olympic fencers of Mexico
Fencers at the 2016 Summer Olympics
Place of birth missing (living people)
Central American and Caribbean Games bronze medalists for Mexico
Competitors at the 2010 Central American and Caribbean Games
Competitors at the 2014 Central American and Caribbean Games
Competitors at the 2018 Central American and Caribbean Games
Central American and Caribbean Games medalists in fencing
21st-century Mexican people